Washing and anointing (also called the initiatory) is a temple ordinance practiced by the Church of Jesus Christ of Latter-day Saints (LDS Church) and Mormon fundamentalists as part of the faith's endowment ceremony. It is a sacred ordinance for teenagers and young adults, similar to chrismation. The ordinance is performed by the authority of the Melchizedek priesthood by an officiator of the same gender as the participant.

In the ritual, a person is sprinkled with water, which is symbolically similar to the washing done by priests prior to entering the temple during the time of Moses. After the washing, the officiator anoints the person with consecrated oil while declaring blessings. The officiator then declares that the person is anointed to become a "king and priest" or a "queen and priestess" in the afterlife.

Once washed and anointed, the participant is dressed in the temple garment, a religious white undergarment which the participant is instructed to wear throughout his or her life. (Since 2005, participants in the LDS Church version of the ritual already come clothed in this garment prior to the washing and anointing.)

History
As the Latter Day Saints were completing their first temple in Kirtland, Ohio, founder Joseph Smith led many of the prominent male church members in a pre-endowment ritual patterned after similar washings and anointings described in the Bible. This ritual took place beginning on 21 January 1836 in the attic of a printing office. Their bodies were washed with water and anointed with perfume, and then their heads were anointed with consecrated oil. Soon after the temple's dedication ceremony on 27 March 1836, about 300 Mormon men participated in a further ritual washing of feet and faces.

Several years later, after Latter Day Saints moved to Nauvoo, Illinois, Smith revised the washing and anointing rituals as part of the new Nauvoo endowment. On 4–5 May 1842, nine prominent male church members were inducted into this endowment ceremony in the upper story of Smith's store. The first woman (Smith's first wife, Emma) was inducted into the endowment ceremony on 28 September 1843.

As the washings and anointings were practiced in Nauvoo, men and women were taken to separate rooms, where they disrobed and, when called upon, passed through a canvas curtain to enter a tub where they were washed from head to foot while words of blessing were recited. Then oil from a horn was poured over the head of the participant, usually by another officiator, while similar words were repeated. As part of the ceremony, participants were ordained to become kings and queens in eternity. Men performed the ritual for men, and women performed the ritual for women. Also, as part of the ceremony, participants were given a new name and a ritual undergarment in which symbolic marks were snipped into the fabric.

Originally, the recipient of the washing and anointing was naked during the ceremony. Beginning in the 20th century, recipients were given a white poncho-like "shield" to wear during the washing and anointing. Since 2005, participants in the LDS Church-version of the ritual already come clothed in the temple garment and wear it during the washing and anointing. In the original version of the ceremony, water and oil were applied to various parts of the body by the officiator as specific blessings related to the body parts were mentioned; since the early-21st century, the water and oil are applied only to the head and the symbolic nature of the washing and anointing is emphasized as the blessings for the body parts are related.

Purpose and administration

Ritual anointings were a prominent part of religious rites in the biblical world. Recipients of the anointing included temple officiants (e.g., Aaron), prophets (e.g., Elisha), and kings (e.g., Jehu, Solomon). In addition, sacral objects associated with the Israelite sanctuary were anointed. Of equal importance in the religion of the Israelites were ablutions (ceremonial washings). To ensure religious purity, Mosaic law required that designated individuals receive a ritual washing, sometimes in preparation for entering the temple.

The washings and anointings of the biblical period have a parallel today in the LDS Church. In response to a commandment to gather the saints and to build a house "to prepare them for the ordinances and endowments, washings, and anointings", these ordinances were introduced in the Kirtland Temple on January 21, 1836. The rites are in many respects similar in purpose to ancient Israelite practice and to the washing of feet by Jesus among his disciples. These modern LDS rites are performed only in temples set apart and dedicated for sacred purposes, according to a January 19, 1841 revelation said by Joseph Smith to be from Jesus Christ.

The ordinances are "mostly symbolic in nature, but promising definite, immediate blessings as well as future blessings," contingent upon continued righteous living. Many symbolic meanings of washings and anointings are traceable in the scriptures. Ritual washings (Heb. 9:10) symbolize the cleansing of the soul from sins and iniquities. They signify the washing-away of the pollutions of the Lord's people (Isa. 4:4). Psalm 51:2 expresses the human longing and divine promise: "Wash me thoroughly from mine iniquity, and cleanse me from my sin". The anointing of a person or object with sacred ointment represents sanctification and consecration, so that both become "most holy" unto the Lord. In this manner, profane persons and things are sanctified in similitude of the messiah (Hebrew "anointed one"), who is Christ (Greek "anointed one").

The ordinances of washing and anointing are referred to often in the temple as "initiatory ordinances" since they precede the endowment and sealing ordinances. In connection with the initiatory ordinances, one is also clothed in the garment in the temple. Washings and anointings are also conducted on behalf of deceased individuals as a type of "vicarious ordinance".

See also

 Anointed Quorum
 Anointing
 Chrism
 Chrismation
 Holy anointing oil
 Second anointing

Notes

References

.
.
.
.
 ("D&C" herein).
.
.
.
.
.

1836 establishments in the United States
1836 in Christianity
Latter Day Saint temple practices
Latter Day Saint terms
Ritual purification
Ritual purity in Christianity
Water and religion